Henry Cosad Harpending (January 13, 1944 – April 3, 2016) was an American anthropologist and writer. He was a distinguished professor at the University of Utah, and formerly taught at Penn State and the University of New Mexico. He was a member of the National Academy of Sciences. He is known for the book The 10,000 Year Explosion, which he co-authored with Gregory Cochran.

Some of Harpending's statements about race, biology and intelligence were controversial. He is described by the Southern Poverty Law Center (SPLC) as a white nationalist, and associated with groups described as such.

Education and career
Harpending was born in Dundee, New York, in 1944. He graduated from Dundee Central High School in 1961, received his A.B. degree from Hamilton College in 1964, and his Ph.D. from Harvard University in 1972. Harpending studied population genetics.

After graduating from Harvard, he worked at Yale (1972-1973), the University of New Mexico (1973–85), Penn State (1985-1997), and the University of Utah (1997-2016). Over his career, he contributed to over 120 publications.

Harpending's first wife was Patricia Draper, with whom he had two children. He married his second wife, Renee Pennington, around 1995. They had one son. He died on April 3, 2016, at the age of 72, following a stroke.

Work

Population genetics 
According to a biography by Alan R. Rogers, in the 1970s Harpending pioneered the study of the relationship between genetics and geography, developing methods that are still in use. He also overturned the prevailing understanding of group selection, by showing that group selection is most likely to operate when there is strong gene flow between groups, rather than when they are isolated from one another. Harpending also developed the approach of analyzing populations using R-matrix methods, and together with Trefor Jonkin, wrote the most highly cited chapter in the 1973 handbook Methods and Theory of Anthropological Genetics.

!Kung and Herero 
Harpending did fieldwork in Southern Africa (Botswana, Namibia) and spoke the !Kung language. In 1981, while with the University of New Mexico, Harpending studied the group during the South African Border War. Harpending described the !Kung society as "like Rorschachs" because anthropologists could draw contradictory conclusions. His fieldwork was the basis of the 1993 monograph The Structure of an African Pastoralist Community, with Pennington.

Harpending also did extensive fieldwork on the Herero people, a cattle-herding group in the Botswana area. Herero are locally known for "their traditionalism, their wealth in cattle and their dominating older women". Harpending's previous experience with the !Kung people was useful because many Herero are bilingual in !Kung. Harpending had previous contact with Herero from earlier research trips.

In 1973, Harpending helped start the Kalahari People's Fund. The KPF was an outgrowth of the multidisciplinary Harvard Kalahari Research Group led by Richard Lee and Irven DeVore. Newsweek described the KPF as one of the first people's advocacy organizations in the US with professional anthropological expertise behind it.

Ashkenazi intelligence 
In the 2005 paper "Natural History Of Ashkenazi Intelligence", Gregory Cochran, Jason Hardy, and Harpending suggest that the high average IQ of Ashkenazi Jews may be attributed to natural selection for intelligence during the Middle Ages and a low rate of genetic inflow. They hypothesize that the occupational profile of the Jewish community in medieval Europe had resulted in selection pressure for mutations that increase intelligence, but can also result in hereditary neurological disorders.

Harpending's hypothesis about Ashkenazi Jewish intelligence has attracted both praise and criticism, with some scientists regarding the theory as highly implausible, while others regard it as worth considering. According to cognitive psychologist Steven Pinker, this theory "meets the standards of a good scientific theory, though it is tentative and could turn out to be mistaken." On the other hand, geneticist David Reich has argued that the hypothesis is contradicted by evidence that the higher rate of genetic diseases among Ashkenazi Jews is in fact due to genetic drift.

The 10,000 Year Explosion 
In The 10,000 Year Explosion, which he co-authored with Gregory Cochran, Harpending suggests a common belief that human genetic adaptation stopped 40,000 years ago is incorrect and that humans evolved  increasingly rapidly in response to the new challenges presented by agriculture and civilization. The result was accelerating evolution which has varied according to new niches or environments that particular populations inhabit.

The final chapter of The 10,000 Year Explosion expands on their paper from the Journal of Biosocial Science on the issue of Ashkenazi Jewish intelligence.  Harpending and Cochran argue the cause of the claim of Ashkenazim having higher mean verbal and mathematical intelligence than other ethnic groups (as well as having a relatively high number of genetic diseases, such as Tay–Sachs disease, Canavan disease, Niemann–Pick disease, Gaucher's disease, familial dysautonomia, Bloom syndrome, Fanconi anemia, cystic fibrosis and mucolipidosis IV) is due to the historically isolated population of Jews in Europe.

Harpending and Cochran's book The 10,000 Year Explosion was reviewed in academic journals including the American Journal of Human Biology, Evolutionary Psychology, Evolution and Human Behavior, Explorations in Anthropology, and the Journal of Anthropological Research. Reviews by Milford H. Wolpoff, Gregory Gorelik and Todd K. Shackelford, and Edward Hagen praised the book as creative and insightful, arguing that it makes a valuable contribution to understanding human evolution, but criticized some of the book's hypotheses as not adequately supported. Negative reviews by Cadell Last and Keith Hunley criticized the book for regarding race as a biological category and for presenting an overly simplistic view of the influence of genetics on human behavioral variation.

Views on race 
The Southern Poverty Law Center has documented Harpending's works and statements on race, noting his association with white supremacist groups and referring to his work as an attempt to perpetuate scientific racism. The SPLC notes he attributed stereotypes of different human populations to genetic differences, often saying that Africans, Papua New Guineans, and "Baltimore" (African-Americans) possess the same genetic temperamental predispositions which he said are characterized by "violence, laziness, and a preference for 'mating instead of parenting'", while Europeans and East Asians "have evolved higher intelligence and 'tend to be more disciplined than people who take life for granted'"; that he favored mass deportation of illegal immigrants from the United States using FEMA camps as part of the process and did not believe that more money should be spent on education in the United States because he thought the race-based disparities are based on genetics rather than disparities in funding; that he gave conferences at what the SPLC designates as white supremacist groups; and that he supported eugenics, crediting it in the form of the death penalty for the "genetic pacification" of the western European population.

Harpending once stated that people of sub-Saharan ancestry do not have the same genetic propensity for "hard work" as Eurasians do. According to geneticist David Reich, "there is simply no scientific evidence to support this statement."

Harpending himself denied being a racist, though he acknowledged that his views would be called racist by others. In 2011, he delivered a lecture on race and intelligence at the H.L. Mencken Club, a white nationalist conference founded by Paul Gottfried and Richard Spencer, described by the Anti-Defamation League as a "racist gathering". In a 2012 blog post, he claimed that institutional racism and white privilege do not exist, describing them as a continuation of traditional African beliefs about witchcraft – a belief in "vague and invisible forces that are oppressing people".

Selected publications

See also
John D. Hawks

References

External links
 West Hunter Blog of Harpending and Cochran. 
 Henry Harpending, Southern Poverty Law Center

1944 births
2016 deaths
American anthropologists
American eugenicists
American white supremacists
Factors related to intelligence
Fellows of the American Association for the Advancement of Science
Harvard University alumni
Members of the United States National Academy of Sciences
People from Yates County, New York
Population geneticists
Race and intelligence controversy
Proponents of scientific racism
University of Utah faculty